Passavant House is a historic home located at Zelienople, Butler County, Pennsylvania.  The oldest house (1808) in Zelienople now serves as a museum, library, and headquarters for the Zelienople Historical Society.  Its name reflects the Passavant family, the most famous of whom was Rev. William Passavant (1821-1894) known for his charitable works on behalf of the Lutheran community in the United States, who was born in the house. The interior now features a large collection of furniture, clothing, personal and household items, particularly of the Passavant family, dating back to the early 1800s. Tours are available upon request.

The simple -story, three-bay by two-bay, brick dwelling on a sandstone foundation was built in 1809, and listed on the National Register of Historic Places in 1977. A two-story frame addition was added to the rear about 1820.  A two-story bay window and porch were added in 1915.

References

External links
 Zelienople Historical Society

Houses on the National Register of Historic Places in Pennsylvania
Houses completed in 1809
Houses in Butler County, Pennsylvania
Museums in Butler County, Pennsylvania
Historic house museums in Pennsylvania
National Register of Historic Places in Butler County, Pennsylvania